Space-Men (a.k.a. Assignment: Outer Space in the United States) is a 1960 Italian science fiction film directed by Antonio Margheriti. The film stars Rik Van Nutter and co-stars Gabriella Farinon, David Montresor, Archie Savage, and Alain Dijon. The film was released in the United States in 1961 by American International Pictures.

Space-Mens storyline recounts a mission in the 22nd century aboard an orbiting space station. The mission involves a risky effort by its crew to redirect a malfunctioning spaceship that threatens to destroy the Earth.

Plot
In 2116, Interplanetary Chronicle of New York reporter Ray Peterson launches aboard the spaceship Bravo Zulu 88, joining the crew of an orbiting space station. Peterson is assigned to write a story about the "infra-radiation flux in Galaxy M12", but soon tension develops between Peterson and the station commander. He believes the reporter is in the way, calling him a "leech", but he has orders not to interfere with Peterson. A complication arises when Lucy, the station botanist and navigator, becomes attracted to both the commander and Peterson.

When the errant Spaceship Alpha Two enters the inner solar system, its photon generators radiate enough heat to destroy the Earth. In efforts to intercept Alpha Two, crew members Sullivan and space station pilot Al sacrifice themselves in separate but futile attempts to destroy the dangerous spaceship with missiles.

With both crew members now dying from their attempts, Peterson uses Space Taxi B91 to get aboard the errant spaceship. His goal: to disarm Alpha Two's photon generators. Once inside, he is directed to disable the spaceship's computers and shut down all power sources. He soon finds himself trapped inside when the power loss also disables the emergency hatch. 

Despite orders from the high command not to intervene, the commander and his assistant disobey and attempt to intercept the out-of-control Alpha Two and rescue Peterson. They are  finally able to reach the reporter as he is collapsing and bring him back safely. With Alpha Two now safely redirected away from the Earth, Peterson wins Lucy's affection and the commander's respect for his heroic actions.

Cast

 Rik Van Nutter as Ray Peterson (IZ41) 
 Gabriella Farinon as Lucy (Y13) (credited as Gaby Farinon in Assignment: Outer Space)
 David Montresor as George the Commander
 Archie Savage as Al (X15)
 Alain Dijon as Archie (Y16)
 Franco Fantasia as Sullivan
 Joe Pollini as King 116
 David Maran as Davis
 José Néstor as Venus Commander
 Anita Todesco as Venus Control
 Aldo Pini as Jacson

Production
Antonio Margheriti had read science fiction comic books since a young age, and when offered the chance to direct a science fiction film, he immediately seized the opportunity. Space-Men was Margheriti's first full directoral effort. He went on to direct 55 films.

Space-Mens script was written by Margheriti and Ennio De Concini. The film was shot at the same time director Mario Bava was filming Black Sunday on a sound stage next door. Margheriti also took over the studio with the miniatures work featured in the film's outer space segments.

Release
Space-Men was distributed by Titanus and opened in Rome in August 1960. The film was re-titled Assignment: Outer Space for its release and opened in San Diego on December 13, 1961.

Reception
In Phil Hardy's book Science Fiction: Complete Film Source Book (1984), Space-Men was described as "... not one of Margheriti's best, the narrative line is unclear and jerky" while also noting that "its visual splendours are ample compensation".

See also
 List of films in the public domain in the United States
 List of science fiction films of the 1960s
 List of Italian films of 1960

References

Notes

Citations

Bibliography

 
 
 
 Warren, Bill. Keep Watching the Skies! American Science Fiction Movies of the Fifties (covers films released through 1962), 21st Century Edition. Jefferson, North Carolina: McFarland & Company, 2009. .

External links
 
 Assignment: Outer Space
 
 

1960 films
1960s science fiction films
American International Pictures films
Films about astronauts
Films directed by Antonio Margheriti
1960s Italian-language films
Italian science fiction films
Space adventure films
Titanus films
Films set in the 2110s
1960 directorial debut films
1960s Italian films